Hautecloque may refer to:

 Philippe Leclerc de Hauteclocque (1902–1947), French general during World War II
 Hautecloque, Pas-de-Calais, France